Mitchell's Siding was a railway siding on the Wonthaggi line on the Bass Coast, Victoria. The siding operated until the 1960s.

Disused railway stations in Victoria (Australia)
Transport in Gippsland (region)
Bass Coast Shire